The YDT-01 class is a class of diving support vessel of the Japan Maritime Self-Defense Force (JMSDF).

Development 
Traditionally, an auxiliary vessel (YAS), which is a modified retired minesweeper, has been used to support the transportation and work of the Explosive Ordnance Corps (EOD). However, these boats are aging, and since they are modified boats, it has been pointed out that they are unreasonable in terms of placement and lack of equipment. For this reason, this model was planned as a purposefully newly designed ship.

Construction was approved as a new ship type in 1998, and the first and second ships were laid down on June 14, 1999.

Ships in the class

Citations 

Ships built in Japan
Auxiliary ships of the Japan Maritime Self-Defense Force